Fardeen Khan (born 8 March 1974) is an Indian actor. He is the recipient of a Filmfare Award (1999) and is the son of the actor, director, and film producer Feroz Khan.

Early life and education
Fardeen Khan was born on 8 March 1974 in Mumbai. He is the son of the Bollywood actor, director, and producer Feroz Khan. His sister is Laila Khan. Khan is the nephew of actors Sanjay Khan and Akbar Khan. He is the cousin of Suzanne Khan and actor Zayed Khan.

After graduating in business management from the University of Massachusetts, Amherst, Khan returned to India to pursue a career in film and trained in acting at the Kishore Namit Kapoor Acting Institute.

Career
Khan made his acting debut in 1998 with a leading role in the romance Prem Aggan, which garnered him the Filmfare Best Debut Award. Khan rose to prominence with starring roles in the acclaimed thriller Jungle (2000), the crime comedy Love Ke Liye Kuch Bhi Karega (2001), the drama Om Jai Jagadish (2002), the supernatural horror  Bhoot (2003), the romance Janasheen (2003), and the comedies No Entry (2005), Heyy Babyy (2007), Life Partner (2009), and All the Best: Fun Begins (2009). He earned critical recognition for his performances in the 2001 thriller Pyaar Tune Kya Kiya, the 2004 drama Dev, the 2004 romantic thriller Fida, and the 2005 crime thriller Ek Khiladi Ek Haseena.

In addition to acting in films, he has participated in concert tours and stage shows. In May 2001, Khan was arrested for attempting to buy cocaine.

In 2010, after his last starring role, Khan took a hiatus from the movie business in order to focus on his family. In December 2020, speculation arose that he may be planning a comeback to acting after being spotted outside the office of film director Mukesh Chhabra. Chhabra later confirmed that the two were exploring opportunities and that they would begin working on a new project in 2021.

Personal life
Fardeen is married to Natasha Madhvani, daughter of actress Mumtaz. The couple has a daughter, Diani, and a son, Azarius.

Filmography

References

External links

 

1974 births
Indian male film actors
Living people
Isenberg School of Management alumni
Male actors in Hindi cinema
Male actors from Mumbai
Filmfare Awards winners
Indian people of Afghan descent
Indian people of Iranian descent